Barclay Prime is an upscale steakhouse located in Philadelphia on S 18th St near Rittenhouse Square. The steakhouse was founded by restaurateur Stephen Starr and owned by his company STARR Restaurants.

History
Stephen Starr opened the steakhouse in 2004. The head chef is Mark Twersky. The steakhouse has Wagyu beef and is known for having a menu item which offers the most expensive cheesesteak in Philadelphia priced at $120 (now $130). The cheesesteak consists of "Wagyu rib-eye, foie gras, onions, truffled cheese whiz and a half-bottle of champagne".

During the COVID-19 pandemic the steakhouse offered "40-day dry-aged rib eye, truffle mac and cheese and chilled Maine lobster cocktail" for delivery.

In 2019, Barclay Prime was listed by The Daily Meal as 6th best steakhouse in the United States in a list of the top 50 non-chain steakhouses saying the steakhouse was "undoubtedly 21st century, the menu is as classic as can be". In 2018, a fund-raising dinner was held for Elizabeth Warren at the steakhouse.

References

External links
 

Restaurants in Philadelphia
2004 establishments in Pennsylvania
Restaurants established in 2004
Steakhouses in the United States